Ramón Heredia Ponce de Leon (born February 18, 1913, date of death unknown) was a Cuban Negro league infielder who played between 1939 and 1941.

A native of Matanzas, Cuba, Heredia made his Negro leagues debut in 1939 with the New York Cubans. He played three seasons with New York, then went on to spend several seasons in the Mexican League through the late 1940s.

References

External links
  and Seamheads
 Ramon Heredia at Negro League Baseball Players Association

1913 births
Year of death missing
New York Cubans players
Sportspeople from Matanzas
Industriales de Monterrey players
Azules de Veracruz players
Cuban expatriate baseball players in Mexico
Baseball infielders
Cuban expatriate baseball players in the United States